"Wavey" is a song by CLiQ, a collaboration from London between DJ/producers Robin M and The Shapeshifters' Max Reich, featuring vocals from fellow British singer Alika McGillivary.

The house track reached number one on Billboard's Dance Club Songs chart in its June 16, 2018 issue, giving the collaboration their first American chart topper.

Track listing
Digital download
"Wavey" (Club Mix) – 4:57
"Wavey" (George Kwali Remix) – 4:40
"Wavey" (DJ Maphorisa Remix) – 3:54

Charts

Weekly charts

Year-end charts

Certifications

References

External links
Official video at YouTube

2017 songs
2018 singles
British electronic songs
British house music songs
Songs about dancing
Columbia Records singles